James Warwick may refer to:

James Warwick (actor) (born 1947), English actor and director
James Warwick (The Bold and the Beautiful), a fictional character in the U.S. TV soap opera The Bold and the Beautiful